Fireball Ministry is an American heavy metal band from Los Angeles, California, formed in 1999.

Biography
Formed in Cincinnati in the late 1990s by James A. Rota II and Emily Burton, Fireball Ministry moved to New York City before settling in Los Angeles. In 2000, they performed at the two-day "November Dismember" metal-music festival in San Bernardino, California, playing on the second day. The festival was situated at the National Orange Show fairgrounds in two hangars.

After several years appearing with various big name bands in the genre such as Danzig, Anthrax, Motörhead, and Slayer, but without a breakthrough in album sales, they polished their own sound to continue gaining a wider following. The tracks "King" and "Flatline" appeared in the big wave surfing documentary Billabong Odyssey (2003). The track "King" was also selected by Bam Margera and appeared on his Viva La Bands compilation. The band teamed up with Margera's brother, Jess, when they toured Europe with CKY in 2004. The track "The Broken" was included in the wrestling video game WWE SmackDown! vs. Raw 2006 for the PlayStation 2.

The band went through four different bass players, starting with Helen Storer, who played on Où est la Rock? (1999) and was replaced by Fu Manchu bassist Brad Davis on FMEP (2001), who was himself replaced by former L7 bass player Janis Tanaka on The Second Great Awakening (2003). Former Systematic bassist Johny Chow then took the place of Tanaka for the Their Rock Is Not Our Rock album (2005), which was recorded at Dave Grohl's 606 West studio and, like the band's previous works, was produced by Nick Raskulinecz. In another connection helped by Margera, they supported CKY on their 2005 Adio Footwear-sponsored tour, having already opened for them on their UK tour in 2004. Original drummer John Oreshnick took a leave of absence due to family issues in the fall of 2006, to be replaced by Yael during their subsequent tour. Yael and Johny Chow were former bandmates in My Ruin. Yael subsequently left the band in winter 2006, and Oreshnick rejoined.

Rota considered becoming an ordained minister, but was persuaded not to on account of possible legal and taxation issues. However, he did eventually become ordained and performed wedding ceremonies for Matt Deis of CKY and Erica Beckmann in November 2005, and Bam Margera and Missy Rothstein in February 2007.

In an interview for Blabbermouth.net in May 2007, James Rota stated that "we [Fireball Ministry] are in the stages of writing a new album". In the same Interview, Rota also referred to what would later become The Company Band EP, Sign Here, Here and Here. On June 14, 2008, Rota stated that three tracks had been recorded for the as yet unnamed fifth Fireball Ministry album, and was also working on a full-length Company Band album and a third, unspecified project. However, Johny Chow was on tour playing bass guitar with Cavalera Conspiracy and Stone Sour.

Some tracks from the album Fireball Ministry such as "Kick Back" "End of Story" and "Fallen Believers" appeared as soundtrack on the Sons of Anarchy television series

The band released their fifth album, Remember the Story, on October 6, 2017, via Cleopatra Records.

Inspiration
The band's imagery draws heavily from Christianity, with "ministry" in their name, the albums The Second Great Awakening and Their Rock Is Not Our Rock, a reference to Deuteronomy 32:31. MTV.com described the band's music as having "a musical chemistry between the members... that makes their songs buzz with warmth".

The name "Fireball Ministry" comes from a public-access TV show in Cincinnati that went by the same name.

Discography

Studio albums
 Où est la Rock? (1999)
 The Second Great Awakening (2003)
 Their Rock Is Not Our Rock (2005)
 Fireball Ministry (2010)
 Remember the Story (2017)

EPs
 FMEP (2001)

Members

Current
James A. Rota II – vocals, guitars (1999–present)
Emily Burton – guitars (1999–present)
John Oreshnick – drums (1999–present)
Scott Reeder – bass (2014–present)

Former
Helen Storer – bass (1999–2001), touring (2018)
Brad Davis – bass (2001–2002)
Janis Tanaka – bass (2002–2004)
Johny Chow – bass (2004–2014) 
Yael – drums (2006)
Brad Prescott – mandolin (2016)

References

1999 establishments in California
Cleopatra Records artists
Hard rock musical groups from California
Heavy metal musical groups from California
Musical quartets
American stoner rock musical groups
Liquor and Poker Music artists
Nuclear Blast artists